The Nuremberg Metropolitan Region comprises 3.5 million people on 21,800 square kilometers. With a gross domestic product of 134 billion euros and about 1.9 million employees, this metropolitan area is one of the strongest economic areas in Germany. The major cities are Nuremberg, Fürth, Erlangen, Bayreuth and Bamberg.

Geographic
The Nuremberg Metropolitan Region encloses geographically the administrative region of Middle Franconia, whole Upper Franconia, two territorial authorities of Lower Franconia and about half of the Upper Palatinate.

Cities and rural district of the region
The region includes the cities Ansbach, Amberg, Bamberg, Bayreuth, Coburg, Erlangen, Fürth, Hof, Nuremberg, Schwabach and Weiden in der Oberpfalz as well as the rural districts of Amberg-Sulzbach, Ansbach, Bamberg, Bayreuth, Coburg, Erlangen-Höchstadt, Forchheim, Fürth, Haßberge, Hof, Kitzingen, Kronach, Kulmbach, Lichtenfels, Neumarkt in der Oberpfalz, Neustadt an der Aisch, Bad Windsheim, Neustadt an der Waldnaab, Nürnberger Land, Roth, Sonneberg, Tirschenreuth, Weißenburg-Gunzenhausen and Wunsiedel im Fichtelgebirge.

Education and research
In the metropolitan region of Nuremberg are several universities and Fachhochschulen (Universities of Applied Sciences). Some examples:
Augustana Divinity School
University of Bamberg
University of Bayreuth
Coburg University of Applied Sciences
University of Erlangen-Nuremberg
University of Applied Sciences Hof
Academy of Fine Arts, Nuremberg
Lutheran University of Applied Sciences Nuremberg
Hochschule Weihenstephan-Triesdorf
Hochschule für Musik Nürnberg

References

Nuremberg
Nuremberg
Regions of Bavaria